"Ultra Soul" is the thirty-first single by B'z, released on March 14, 2001. This song is one of B'z many number-one singles in Oricon charts. As B-Sides, the single features "Rock Man" and "Suima-Yo 2001!!", a remix of the song "Suima-Yo!!" previously released on the album Survive. "Ultra Soul" was featured in the arcade drumming game Taiko no Tatsujin 2, sequel to the first version of the game that featured another B'z song, "Atsuki Kodō no Hate". This Song was featured in the International Television Intro of 2001 FINA World Aquatics Championships.

In 2011, the song was certified digitally by the RIAJ as a gold single for being downloaded more than 100,000 times to cellphones since its release as a digital download in early 2005.

A re-recorded version of the song titled "ultra soul 2011" appears on their 2011 album C'mon.

The song appears in Rocksmith 2014 for the guitar and bass.

The same year of its release, the song was adopted as an entrance theme by professional wrestler Masayuki Naruse, and it became strongly associated with him during his stint in New Japan Pro-Wrestling. Naruse himself was nicknamed "Ultra Soul" due to it.

Track listing
"Ultra Soul"
"
"Rock Man"

Certifications

References

B'z performance at Oricon
Ultra Soul (song) in 2001 FINA World Aquatics Championships TV Intro

External links
B'z official website

2001 singles
B'z songs
Oricon Weekly number-one singles
Songs written by Tak Matsumoto
Songs written by Koshi Inaba
2001 songs